Sint-Pieters is a suburb of Bruges, in the province of West Flanders, Belgium.

Populated places in West Flanders
Geography of Bruges